Dahme may refer to:

Places

Dahme, Brandenburg, a town in Brandenburg, Germany
Dahme, Schleswig-Holstein, a municipality in Schleswig-Holstein, Germany
Dahme (river), a river in Brandenburg, Germany
Dahme-Spreewald, a district of Brandenburg, Germany

People with that surname

Kimberley Dahme (born 1966), rock/country music singer and songwriter, former member of the band Boston